Scoliciosporaceae is a family of lichen-forming fungi in the order Lecanorales. It contains two genera, the monotypic Umushamyces, and the type genus Scoliciosporum. The family was circumscribed by lichenologist Josef Hafellner in 1984.

References

Lecanorales
Lecanoromycetes families
Taxa described in 1984
Taxa named by Josef Hafellner
Lichen families